Four Presidents Corners is the quadripoint where the borders of four townships named for the third, fourth, fifth, and seventh American presidents meet in Allen County, in the U.S. state of Indiana. The townships are Jefferson, Madison, and Monroe, and Jackson.

Monument

A monument at the rural intersection of Maples and Sampson roads in Monroe Township was constructed to mark the point and opened on September 22, 1917. The ceremony included a speech by Congressman Louis W. Fairfield. A flagpole was once part of the site. There were also proposals to include a cannon.
The Four Presidents Corners Historical Society raised funds to restore the Four Presidents Corners Monument for the centennial of its dedication, with the work conducted in 2015. The name is used for the neighborhood around the monument.

While there are numerous quadripoints in the United States, for example, three Indiana county quadripoints (Starke/Marshall/Pulaski/Fulton; Porter/LaPorte/Jasper/Starke; DeKalb/LaGrange/Noble/Steuben) none are named for presidents and memorialized such as this one.

See also
Four Corners (disambiguation)
Four Corners Monument

References

External links

Four Presidents Corners

Road junctions in the United States
Quadripoints and higher
Allen County, Indiana